Bjornbergiella hawaiiensis is a Hawaiian species of cryptomonad described in 1965. It is the sole member of the genus Bjornbergiella.

References

Cryptomonads